The Union Dutchwomen represented Union College in ECAC women's ice hockey during the 2015–16 NCAA Division I women's ice hockey season.

Recruiting

2015–16 Dutchwomen

2015-16 Schedule

Despite a largely frustrating season, the Dutchwomen remained competitive in many of their ECAC games, proving to be tough opposition to teams such as Colgate, Cornell and Yale, and never surrendered more than 4 goals to a team that was not nationally ranked.

|-
!colspan=12 style=""| Regular Season

References

Union
Union Dutchwomen ice hockey seasons